Filippo Cristante (born 20 April 1977, in San Vito al Tagliamento) is an Italian football manager and former player, who last played as a defender for Italian club Portogruaro in Lega Pro.

Career
Cristante started his career in the amateur divisions, with Sacilese, where he already demonstrated his talent, before moving to Serie B side Cosenza. Experiences with Padova and Ravenna in Serie B soon followed. In 2001, he moved to Piacenza, which he made his debut in the top division, starting in the Serie A match Lazio–Piacenza, on August 26, 2001, which ended in a 1–1 away draw. He remained with Piacenza (playing in two in first division league championships and two in Serie B) until January 2005, when he was hired by Messina in Serie A. With the team, he scored his first and so far only goal in the top division, under Peloritana. Since 2006, he has played for Mantova in the second division of Italian Football.

In July 2009, he signed a two-year contract with Ancona.

Style of play
Equipped with a powerful physique, Cristante was a hard-working, tenacious and hard-tackling footballer who specialised in defensive roles; a versatile player, he was capable of playing anywhere along the back-line, and throughout his career he was used as a left or right-back, and as a central defender. Originally he played as an attacker, but was soon deployed in defence.

Match-fixing scandal
Cristante was involved in the 2011–12 Italian football match-fixing scandal and was banned from any soccer-related activities for three years.

References

External links

1977 births
Living people
People from San Vito al Tagliamento
Italian footballers
Italy under-21 international footballers
Cosenza Calcio 1914 players
Calcio Padova players
Ravenna F.C. players
Piacenza Calcio 1919 players
A.C.R. Messina players
Mantova 1911 players
A.C. Ancona players
A.S.D. Portogruaro players
Serie A players
Serie B players
Association football defenders
Footballers from Friuli Venezia Giulia